The 2005–06 Kategoria Superiore was the 70th season of top-tier football in Albania and the eighth season under the name Kategoria Superiore.

Teams

Stadia and last season

League table

Results
Each team plays every opponent four times, twice at home and twice away, for a total of 36 games.

First half of season

Second half of season

Playoffs

Relegation playoff

Season statistics

Top goalscorers

Notes

References
Albania - List of final tables (RSSSF)

Kategoria Superiore seasons
Albanian Superliga
1